Mega Enterprise or also MEGA, was a South Korean company that specialised in developing video games. Mega Enterprise was best known for publishing and porting some of video game titles developed by Data East and Technōs Japan to the PC for the Korean market, as well as having developed two arcade-only games: Pull Trigger (released in 2003), and Metal Slug 4 with Noise Factory for the Neo Geo after the original developer, SNK, went bankrupt.

In South Korea, Mega also published PC and PS2 games from companies like Activision (for the first), and SNK Playmore (instead for the second).
It also developed Metal Slug Online game for PC.

Games published by MEGA
All games listed for each platform are published only in South Korea.

Arcade
 Metal Slug 4 (2002) - co-developed with Noise Factory and Playmore
 The King of Fighters 2003 (2003)
 Metal Slug 5 (2003) - co-developed with Noise Factory and SNK Playmore
 Power Instinct Matrimelee (2003)
 Pull Trigger (2003)
 Rage of the Dragons (2002) - co-developed with Evoga Entertainment
 SNK vs. Capcom: SVC Chaos (2003)
 Time Crisis 3 (2003)
 Tekken 5 (2004)

Personal computer (PC)
 Super Dodge Ball (2001)
 Call of Duty (2003)
 Day of Defeat (2003)
 Empires: Dawn of the Modern World (2003)
 X2: Wolverine's Revenge (2003)
 Call of Duty: United Offensive (2004)
 Medieval: Total War (2004)
 Shrek 2 (2004)
 Spider-Man 2 (2004)
 Zwei: The Arges Adventure (2004; developed by Falcom in 2001)

PlayStation 2

 Tenchu: Wrath of Heaven (2003)
 Metal Slug 3 (2003)
 The King of Fighters 2001 (2004)
 Fu-un Shinsengumi (2004)
 Kaidō Battle 2: Chain Reaction (2004)
 Kengo 3 (2004)
 KOF: Maximum Impact (2004)
 SNK vs. Capcom: SVC Chaos (2004)
 Starsky & Hutch (2004)
 Fu-un Bakumatsu-den (2005)
 The King of Fighters 2002/2003 (2005)

Mobile phone
 Catch the Crab
 Zwei!!

Web Online
 KongKong Online
 Poporu
 TOOJI Online

References

Video game publishers
Video game companies established in 1998
Video game companies disestablished in 2007
Defunct video game companies of South Korea
Companies that have filed for bankruptcy in South Korea
South Korean companies established in 1998